SS Henry R. Schoolcraft (MC contract 2132) was a Liberty ship built in the United States during World War II.

Named after Henry R. Schoolcraft, an American geographer, geologist, and ethnologist, the ship was laid down by Permanente Metals in their Richmond Yard #1 on 11 December 1943, then launched on 30 December 1943.  The vessel was operated by Seas Shipping Company under a USAT (United States Army Transport) identification, meaning that it was under the control of the Army Transportation Service. In 1947, the ship was sold into private ownership. However, in 1967, the ship was wrecked and subsequently scrapped.

References

External links
U.S. Maritime Service Veterans 

Liberty ships
Ships built in Richmond, California
1943 ships